Skeneopsis planorbis is a species of gastropods belonging to the family Skeneopsidae.

The species is found in Eastern Northern America, Northern Atlantic Ocean, Europe, Mediterranean.

References

Skeneopsidae